Rhectosemia excisalis is a moth in the family Crambidae. It was described by Snellen in 1900. It is found in Argentina.

References

Spilomelinae
Moths described in 1900